Benjamin T. "Ben" King (born March 22, 1989) is an American former professional road racing cyclist, who competed as a professional from 2008 to 2022.

Personal
Born in Richmond, Virginia, King spent his adolescence in North Garden, Virginia, United States. He now resides in North Garden and Lucca, Tuscany, Italy. King graduated from Monticello High School, in Charlottesville, Virginia, in 2007. He attended Virginia Tech, in Blacksburg, Virginia, between 2008 and 2009.

Career

In March 2015, King won Stage 1 of the Critérium International. He was named in the start list for the 2015 Vuelta a España.

After a 2016 season in which he took a stage win at the Tour of California, in September of that year  confirmed that King would join them for 2017 with a role as a leader and mentor for the team's younger climbers. The move will reunite King with former Garmin team-mates Tyler Farrar, Nathan Haas and Lachlan Morton.

In May 2018, he was named in the startlist for the 2018 Giro d'Italia and finished 44th in the General Classification out of 149 finishing cyclists.

In August 2018, he won the first Grand Tour stage of his career at the Vuelta a España on stage 4 and backed this up with another victory on stage 9. He would finish the race in 24th overall.

Major results

2007
 National Junior Road Championships
1st  Road race
1st  Time trial
 5th Overall Tour de l'Abitibi
2009
 3rd Road race, National Under-23 Road Championships
 8th Overall Univest Grand Prix
2010
 1st  Road race, National Road Championships
 1st  Road race, National Under-23 Road Championships
 3rd Overall Coupe des nations Ville Saguenay
 6th Paris–Roubaix Espoirs
 7th Overall Nature Valley Grand Prix
1st  Young rider classification
 Pan American Road Championships
9th Time trial
10th Road race
 9th Overall Cascade Cycling Classic
1st  Young rider classification
2011
 1st  Young rider classification, Tour of Beijing
 5th Road race, National Road Championships
2013
 1st Shenandoah 100
  Most Aggressive, USA Pro Cycling Challenge
2014
 8th GP Miguel Induráin
2015
 1st Stage 1 Critérium International
 2nd Time trial, National Road Championships
2016
 1st Stage 2 Tour of California
2018
Vuelta a España
1st Stages 4 & 9
 1st  Mountains classification, Volta ao Algarve
 5th Road race, National Road Championships
2020 
 8th Faun-Ardèche Classic
2021
 1st Stage 6 Volta a Portugal
 8th Vuelta a Castilla y León
2022
 1st  Mountains classification, Volta a la Comunitat Valenciana
 4th Road race, National Road Championships

Grand Tour general classification results timeline

References

External links

 
Cycling Base: Benjamin King
Cycling Quotient: Benjamin King

Cannondale-Garmin: Ben King

1989 births
Living people
American male cyclists
American cycling road race champions
American Vuelta a España stage winners
Sportspeople from Richmond, Virginia
Cyclists from Virginia